Thalma de Freitas (Rio de Janeiro, May 14, 1974) is a Brazilian actress, singer and composer.

Career 
The daughter of the composer, conductor and pianist , at 14 she began studying singing and acting at the Teatro Escola Macunaíma. SHe made her acting debut in 1992, in a stage production of Hair, and in 1996 she debuted on television in the Rede Manchete telenovela Xica da Silva. She then got her an exclusive contract with TV Globo, during which she starred in over a dozen telenovelas.

She made her recording debut in 2004, with the album Thalma. The same year, she was awarded Best Supporting Actress at the Gramado Film Festival for her performance in  Joel Zito Araújo's Filhas do Vento. 

In 2012, she performed at the closing ceremony of the London Paralympics together with Carlinhos Brown and Os Paralamas do Sucesso. As a composer, she has collaborated with a variety of artists including Gal Costa, Mariana Aydar, Gaby Amarantos, Ed Motta and Filipe Catto. She also collaborated with Kamasi Washington on three albums. Her 2019 album Sorte!, in collaboration with composer John Finbury, was nominated for a Grammy Award in the Best Latin Jazz Album category.

Personal life 
Married to photographer Brian Cross, with whom she had a daughter, since 2012 she lives in Los Angeles.

Discography 
1996 	- Thalma  (Sony Music)
2004 	- Thalma de Freitas 	  (EMI)
2007 	- Carnaval Só No Ano Que Vem (Som Livre)
2019 	- Sorte! (with John Finbury, Green Flash Music)

Filmography

Cinema 
 
 2001 -	A Samba for Sherlock 	 
 2003 	- O Corneteiro Lopes 	 
 2004 	- Filhas do Vento 	
 2006 	- Alabê de Jerusalém 	 
 2009 	- Heaven Garden 	 
 2011 	- Mundo Invisível

Television 
  
 1996 - Xica da Silva
 1996 - Vira Lata
 1998 - Dona Flor
 1998 - Malhação
 1998 - Labirinto
 1999 - Andando nas Nuvens 
 2000 - Laços de Família
 2001 - O Clone
 2003 - Kubanacan
 2004 - Começar de Novo
 2005 - Bang Bang
 2006 - Lu Gisele
 2007 - Som Brasil
 2007 - Sete Pecados
 2009 - Caras & Bocas
 2010 - Malhação

References

External links 

 
 
 

Living people
1974 births
20th-century Brazilian actresses
21st-century Brazilian actresses
21st-century Brazilian singers
Musicians from Rio de Janeiro (city)
Actresses from Rio de Janeiro (city)
Afro-Brazilian actresses
Afro-Brazilian singers